The National Union of Ethical Citizens (UNACE) is a right-wing populist political party in Paraguay.

History
The party was established in 2002, although its predecessor, the Unión Nacional de Colorados Éticos, was founded in 1996 as a faction within the ruling Colorado party. It first contested national elections in 2003, when it won 10 seats in the Chamber of Deputies and seven in the Senate, becoming the joint-third largest party. Its candidate in the presidential election, Guillermo Sánchez, finished fourth with 13.9% of the vote.

In January 2008, Lino Oviedo, who was released from prison in September 2007, was nominated unopposed as the party's presidential candidate for the April elections. In the elections the party won 15 seats in the Chamber and nine in the Senate, whilst Oviedo finished third with 22.8% of the vote.

Electoral history

Presidential elections

Chamber of Deputies elections

Senate elections

References

External links
Official website 

Conservative parties in South America
Paraguayan nationalism
Political parties established in 2002
Political parties in Paraguay
2002 establishments in Paraguay